Rao Bahadur Gopal Hari Deshmukh also known as Lokhitwadi (18 February 1823 – 9 October 1892) was an Indian activist, thinker, social reformer and writer from Maharashtra. His original surname was Shidhaye. Because of 'Vatan' (right of Tax collection) that the family had received, the family was later called Deshmukh.
Deshmukh is regarded as an important figure of the Social Reform Movement in Maharashtra.

Early life
Gopal Hari Deshmukh was born into a Chitpavan Brahmin family, a member of Maharashtrian Brahmins, in 1823. He is a descendant of Vishwanathpant Sidhaye, a Deshmukh who held a vatan of many villages. Before adopting the surname 'Deshmukh' and settling in Pune, their family name was 'Sidhaye' and was native of Konkan. His father was the treasurer of Bapu Gokhale, the general of Bajirao II during the Third Anglo-Maratha War. Deshmukh studied at the Poona English Medium School.

Career
Deshmukh started his career as a translator for the government then under British Raj. In 1867, the government appointed him a small cause judge in Ahmedabad, Gujarat. He worked as a Diwan also in Ratlam state. The government had commended him with the honorifics 'Justice of Peace' and 'Raobahadur' while he was still working. He retired as a sessions judge. He held many other important positions, including those of the Assistant Inam Commissioner, Joint Judge of Nasik High Court, and Member of the Law Council.

Social activism

Social work in Maharashtra
At age 25, Deshmukh started writing articles aimed at social reform in Maharashtra in the weekly Prabhakar (प्रभाकर) under the pen name Lokhitawadi (लोकहितवादी). In the first two years, he penned 108 articles on social reform. That group of articles has come to be known in Marathi literature as Lokhitawadinchi Shatapatre (लोकहितवादींची शतपत्रे).

He promoted emancipation (liberation) and education of women, and wrote against arranged child marriages, dowry system, and polygamy, all of which were prevalent in India in his times.

He wrote against the evils of the caste system which was strongly prevalent in India in his times, condemned harmful Hindu religious orthodoxy, and attacked the monopoly in religious matters and rituals which Brahmin priests had through a long tradition (Deshmukh, himself, belonged to the Brahmin caste). He enunciated certain 15 principles for bringing about religious reform in Hindu society.

Deshmukh founded a public library in Pune under the leadership of the then governor of the state of Bombay, Henry Brown. He also donated some books to Univ. of Bombay (1875) Library, when it was established by British people. His personal collection is added to Univ. of Mumbai – J.N.Library, Vidyanagari, Mumbai -400098 − called as "Deshmukh collection". His life-size portrait (with some amount to add some new books from its interest every year) is donated to Univ. of Mumbai Library by his 5th generation − Mr. Ajit S. Deshmukh & Librarian/Poet/Translator- Mrs. Jyoti (Deshmukh) Kunte in his Death Centenary year 1992, for the benefit of students doing research on his work.

He took a leadership role in founding Gyan Prakash (ज्ञानप्रकाश), Indu Prakash (इंदुप्रकाश), and Lokhitwadi (लोकहितवादी) periodicals in Maharashtra.

Lokahitwadi Gopal Hari Deshmukh Trust is now carrying forward his legacy by promoting and assisting social causes such as education of poor children by means of Scholarships, cleanlinesses drives, working with PMC and Police authorities to make roads safer and other social causes.

Social work in Gujarat
While Deshmukh was serving as a judge in Ahmedabad, he organized in that city annual speech conferences on social issues under the sponsorship of Premabhai Institute, and also himself delivered speeches. He established in Ahmedabad a branch of Prarthana Samaj, founded an institute promoting remarriages of widows, and invigorated Gujarat Vernacular Society. He started a weekly Hitechchhu ('हितेच्छु) in both Gujarati and English. He also started " Gujarati Budhhi-Wardhak Sabha".

Books
Deshmukh wrote 35 books on diverse topics, including religious, social, economic, political, historic, and literary matters. He wrote Panipat war, Kalyog, Jatibhed, Lankecha Itihas. He also translated some English works into Marathi. Many books are written on him & his work by famous writers.

His writing includes topics like Panipat, History of Gujarat and History of Lanka.

References

Marathi-language writers
Indian independence activists from Maharashtra
Marathi people
1823 births
1892 deaths
Gujarati-language writers
Indian social reformers
Members of the Bombay Legislative Council
Prarthana Samaj